The 2023 Strade Bianche Donne was an Italian road cycling one-day race that took place on 4 March 2023. It was the ninth edition of Strade Bianche Donne and the fifth event of the 2023 UCI Women's World Tour.

Route
The race starts and finishes in Siena, Italy. The route is identical to that of the previous years, containing 30 km of 'strade bianche gravel roads spread over eight sectors, for a total distance of 136 km. The final kilometre in Siena to the finish line in the Piazza del Campo has an maximum gradient of 16%.

Teams
Fourteen UCI Women's WorldTeams and eleven UCI Women's Continental Teams make up the twenty-five teams that will compete in the race.UCI Women's WorldTeams 
 
 
 
 
 
 
 
 
 
 
 
 
 UCI Women's Continental Teams'

 
 
 
 
 
 
 GB Junior Team Piemonte Pedale Castanese A.S.D.

Result

References

External links
 

Strade Bianche
Strade Bianche
Strade Bianche
Strade Bianche Women